William Berridge (7 September 1892 – 1 April 1968) was an English cricketer. Berridge was a right-handed batsman who bowled right-arm medium pace. He was born in Leicester, Leicestershire.

Berridge made his first-class debut for Leicestershire against Kent at Aylestone Road in the 1923 County Championship, with him making a further first-class appearance in that season against Gloucestershire. The following season he made eleven first-class appearances in the 1924 County Championship, the last of which came against Warwickshire. In his thirteen first-class matches for Leicestershire, Berridge scored 146 runs at an average of 6.95, with a high score of 33.

He died at the city on 1 April 1968.

References

External links
William Berridge at ESPNcricinfo
William Berridge at CricketArchive

1892 births
1968 deaths
Cricketers from Leicester
English cricketers
Leicestershire cricketers